Machian Rural District is a rural district (dehestan) in Kelachay District, Rudsar County, Gilan Province, Iran. At the 2006 census, its population was 7,917, in 2,210 families. The rural district has 43 villages.

References 

Rural Districts of Gilan Province
Rudsar County